Ceroplesis ferrugator is a species of beetle in the family Cerambycidae. It was described by Johan Christian Fabricius in 1787. It is known from Mozambique, Botswana, South Africa, Namibia, and Zimbabwe.

References

ferrugator
Beetles described in 1787